Are You My Mother? is a 2010 album released by Canadian musician Kathryn Calder. It is Calder's debut solo album.  She had previously released records as a member of Immaculate Machine and The New Pornographers.

Background
The album was named after the children's book with the same name.  It was recorded when Calder was caring for her sick mother, and the project was put on hold when her mother died.  A feature in Victoria's Times Colonist noted that the album features her mother's "spirit and influence, but not the sadness associated with her death".

Recording
The album was recorded in Calder's family home in Victoria, British Columbia. After touring with The New Pornographers for three years, Calder began work on the album.   Since she missed home and was caring for her mother, she set up a home studio with producer Colin Stewart.   New Pornographer bandmates Todd Fancey, Kurt Dahle, Neko Case, and members of Ladyhawk and Frog Eyes play on the album.

Reception
Amanda Ash of Exclaim! praised the album as "melodically diverse and incredibly easy to sink into" and wrote that the songs are "perfectly manicured soundscapes".  François Marchand of the Vancouver Sun gave the album a favorable review, stating that it is a "fine and poignant indie-pop record".

Track listing

References

2010 albums
Kathryn Calder albums